Sun-woo, also spelled Seon-u, Sŏn-u, or Seon-woo, is a Korean surname and unisex given name. It may also be written without the hyphen after the 'n', particularly when used as a surname.

Surname
As a surname, Sun-woo is written with the hanja . Taewon Sunwoo clan is one of the Korean clans. The bon-gwan of the surname is Taiyuan, Shanxi, China. The 2000 South Korean census estimated that there were 3,560 people with this surname in South Korea, making it the second-most common two-syllable surname in the country.

People with this surname include:
Sunwoo Yong-nyeo (born Jung Yong-rye, 1945), South Korean actress
Sunwoo Hwi (1922–1986), South Korean writer
Sunwoo Eun-sook (born 1959), South Korean actress
Sunwoo Jae-duk (born 1962), South Korean actor
Sunwoo Sun (born Jung Yoo-jin, 1975), South Korean actress
Sonu Kyong-sun (born 1983), North Korean football defender
Sunwoo Jung-a (born 1985), South Korean singer
Yekwon Sunwoo (born 1989), South Korean pianist
Brenda Paik Sunoo, American journalist of Korean descent
Sonu Hyanghui, North Korean violinist, member of the Moranbong Band

Given name
As a given name, the meaning of Sun-woo differs based on the hanja used to write the name. There are 41 hanja with the reading "seon" and 41 hanja with the reading "woo" on the South Korean government's official list of hanja which may be registered for use in given names.

People with this given name include:

Sportspeople
Sun-woo Kim (born 1977), South Korean male baseball pitcher (Korea Baseball Organization)
Kim Sun-woo (footballer born 1983), South Korean male football forward (K-League Classic)
Kim Sun-woo (footballer born 1986), South Korean male football midfielder (K-League Challenge)
Kim Sun-woo (footballer, born 1993), South Korean male football midfielder (K-League Classic)
Kim Sun-woo (pentathlete) (born 1996), South Korean female modern pentathlete
Kwon Sun-oo (born 1999), South Korean female snowboarder

Other
Jang Sun-woo (born 1952), South Korean film director
Kim Seon-wu (born 1970), South Korean poet
Infiltration (video gamer) (born Lee Seon-woo, 1985), South Korean professional electronic games player
Baro (singer) (born Cha Sun-woo, 1992), South Korean singer
Sun Woo Lee, South Korean businessman, former Samsung COO

Fictional characters
Kim Sun-woo, in 2005 South Korean film A Bittersweet Life
Kim Sun-woo, in 2011 South Korean television series Poseidon
Kim Sun-woo, in 2012 South Korean television series Man from the Equator
Jung Sun-woo, in 2013 South Korean television series Monstar
Park Sun-woo, in 2013 South Korean television series Nine: Nine Time Travels
Ha Sun-woo, in 2014 South Korean television series Cheo Yong
Sung Sun-woo, in 2015 South Korean television series Reply 1988
Park Sun-woo, in 2016 South Korean television series Signal
Ji Sun-woo, in 2020 South Korean television series The World of the Married
Lee Sun-woo, in 2020 South Korean television series Nobody Knows

See also
List of Korean given names

References

Korean unisex given names
Korean-language surnames